Shamantakamani is a 2017 Indian Telugu-language comedy thriller film, produced by V. Anand Prasad on Bhavya Creations banner and directed by Sriram Adittya. The film stars Nara Rohit, Sudheer Babu, Sundeep Kishan, Aadi Saikumar and Rajendra Prasad. The music was composed by Mani Sharma.

The film marked the debut of Sudheer Babu's son, Darshan as a child artist, the grandson of the veteran actor Krishna and nephew to Mahesh Babu. The film's first look motion picture released on 28 May and teaser on 15 June 2017. The film was released on 14 July 2017 and was a good entertainer. In 2019, the film was dubbed into Hindi as  Aakhari Baazi by Aditya Movies.

Plot
The film revolves around a 5-crores worth vintage Rolls-Royce car called Shamanthakamani owned by a millionaire Krishna (Sudheer Babu), which was stolen from the parking lot of a 5-star hotel. Inspector Ranjith Kumar (Nara Rohit) is appointed to find out the missing car. During the investigation, he suspects three people as accusing: a car mechanic Uma Maheswara Rao / Mahesh Babu (Rajendra Prasad); a Kotipalli villager Siva (Sundeep Kishan); and a middle-class youngster Karthik (Aadi Saikumar) and arrests them. The rest of the story is what happened to the car? Who is the actual culprit? How does Ranjith Kumar solve the crime?

Cast

Nara Rohit as Inspector Ranjith Kumar
Sudheer Babu as Krishna
Sundeep Kishan as Kotipalli Siva
Aadi Saikumar as Karthik 
Rajendra Prasad as Uma Maheswara Rao / Mahesh Babu
Chandini Chowdary as Madhu, Karthik's girlfriend 
Suman as Jaganath, Krishna's father
Tanikella Bharani as A. K. Ganapathi Sastry, Karthik's father 
Indraja as Bhanumathi, Uma Maheshwara Rao's love interest and a widowed woman
Kasthuri as Krishna's mother 
Hema as Karthik's mother
Satyam Rajesh as Siva's friend
Banerjee as Madhu's father 
Raghu Karumanchi as Constable Satyanarayana 
Gundu Sudarshan as Mani Ratnam
Jeeva as ACB Officer
Surekha Vani as Krishna's step-mother 
Ananya Soni as Smitha
Giridhar as Jaganath's P.A.
Sarika Ramachandra Rao as Chandram
Sriram R Eragam as A. K. Khan
Jenny Honey as Sridevi, Siva's former love interest 
Master Darshan as Young Krishna 
Laxman Meesala
 Abhay Bethiganti

Soundtrack

Reception 
Jeevi of Idlebrain.com wrote that "On a whole, Shamanthakamani is an authentic thriller that entertains. You may watch it!" A critic from The Times of India wrote that "If it has to be called an experiment, the film doesn’t disappoint".

References

External links 

 

Films scored by Mani Sharma
Indian comedy thriller films
2010s comedy thriller films
2010s Telugu-language films
Films directed by Sriram Adittya